Giuseppe Valiani (April 26, 1730 in Pistoia – April 26, 1800) was an Italian painter.

Biography
He was a pupil of Vincenzo Meucci in Florence. He then traveled with Marchese Francesco Albergati to Bologna, for whom he painted mythological subjects in the Villa at Zola Predosa; these frescoes are considered by many to be his masterpiece. In Bologna, he was soon admitted to the Accademia Clementina, where he was director and for a term, president. He also completed frescoes in houses in Bologna for the Tanari, Merendoni, Pallavicini, Bianchi, and Isolani families. In Venice he painted a ceiling in one of the theaters. In Pistoia, he painted frescoes for the Villa Ippoliti in Merlo, and the Villa Forteguerri in Spazzavento.

His nephew, Bartolomeo Valiani, was his pupil and also a painter.

References

1730 births
1800 deaths
18th-century Italian painters
Italian male painters
Painters from Florence
Painters from Bologna
18th-century Italian male artists